The 1961 Tennessee Volunteers football team (variously "Tennessee", "UT" or the "Vols") represented the University of Tennessee in the 1961 NCAA University Division football season. Playing as a member of the Southeastern Conference (SEC), the team was led by head coach Bowden Wyatt, in his seventh year, and played their home games at Shields–Watkins Field in Knoxville, Tennessee. They finished the season with a record of six wins and four losses (6–4 overall, 4–3 in the SEC).

Schedule

Team players drafted into the NFL

References

Tennessee
Tennessee Volunteers football seasons
Tennessee Volunteers football